Ogalur is a village in Perambalur district, Tamil Nadu, India. It was formerly in Tiruchirappalli district.

The village was the site of violence between police and Dalits in 1998.

Villages in Perambalur district